Suresh Kuso Amonkar (15 May 1952 – 6 July 2020) was an Indian politician.

Biography
He was elected to the Goa Legislative Assembly from Pale in the 1999 and 2002 Goa Legislative Assembly election as a member of the Bharatiya Janata Party. He was Minister of  Health, Social Welfare, and Labour & Employment in Francisco Sardinha cabinet from 1999 to 2000 then Minister of  Health, Labour & Employment, and Factories and Boilers in First Manohar Parrikar cabinet.

He lost the 2007 Goa Legislative Assembly election to the Congress Candidate Gurudas Gawas, he ran as an independent candidate in 2008 By-Election after Gurudas Gawas death as the party had allotted the ticket to youth leader Pramod Sawant and he lost the election to Gurudas Gawas brother Pratap Prabhakar Gauns. He joined rebel RSS leaders Subhash Velingkar's Goa Suraksha Manch in November 2016 and was allotted Sanquelim seat in the 2017 Goa Legislative Assembly election where he received 3,831 votes and came third.

He died from COVID-19 during the COVID-19 pandemic in India in July 2020.

References

1952 births
2020 deaths
Members of the Goa Legislative Assembly
People from North Goa district
Goa Suraksha Manch politicians
Bharatiya Janata Party politicians from Goa
Deaths from the COVID-19 pandemic in India